Paratrimma is a genus of gobies endemic to Chile where they are only found around the Juan Fernández Islands and the Desventuradas Islands in the southeastern Pacific Ocean.

Species
There are currently two recognized species in this genus:
 Paratrimma nigrimenta Hoese & Brothers, 1976
 Paratrimma urospila Hoese & Brothers, 1976

References

Gobiidae